Collin Abranches (born 12 December 1991) is an Indian professional footballer who last played as a defender for I-League side Gokulam Kerala.

Career

Air India
In early 2011 Collin signed for local Mumbai club Air India FC who play in the national I-League. On 9 January 2011, Collin played and scored in his first ever professional match for Air India in an I-League match against HAL. He then scored his second career goal against Dempo on 18 December 2011.

Salgaocar
Abranches made his debut for Salgaocar F.C. on 22 September 2012 during a Federation Cup match against United Sikkim F.C. at the JRD Tata Sports Complex in Jamshedpur, Jharkhand; Salgaocar won the match 0–3.

Mohammedan
On 31 May 2013, it was confirmed that Abranches had signed for Mohammedan along with Sandeep Sangha. 
He made his debut for Mohammedan in the I-League on 21 September 2013 against Pune F.C. at the Salt Lake Stadium and played the whole match; as Mohammedan lost the match 1–3.

Mumbai FC
On 16 September 2014, Mumbai FC announced that they have signed Collin Abranches.

Ozone FC
In July 2016, Abranches joined Bengaluru based I-League 2nd Division club Ozone. He played all the 6 preliminary round matches of 2016–17 I-League 2nd Division. However, the club failed to progress to the final round of the league and finished third in their group.

Bengaluru FC
On 24 July 2017, Abranches was drafted by Indian Super League debutants Bengaluru FC.
After being an unused substitute for both the legs of the club's AFC Cup matches against 4.25 Sports Club of North Korea, he made his debut in the same tournament, starting in a 1—0 defeat against Tajik club Istiklol. On 8 July 2018 Bengaluru FC released him along with four other players.

Career statistics

Club
Statistics accurate as of 17 May 2015

References

External links

Indian footballers
1991 births
Living people
Footballers from Mumbai
I-League players
Air India FC players
Salgaocar FC players
Mohammedan SC (Kolkata) players
Indian Super League players
Mumbai FC players
Bengaluru FC players
Association football defenders
Association football midfielders